Ganbayar Maambayar (born May 16, 1996), better known as Gremix, is a Mongolian YouTuber, known primarily for his comedic formatted shows on YouTube. As of February 2023, his channel has over 350+ million views and over 850+ thousand subscribers, and is ranked the most-subscribed and watched channel in Mongolia. He is the first Mongolian YouTube creator to receive the Silver Play Button.

Early life and education 
Maambayar was born on 16 May 1996 in Ulaanbaatar, Mongolia as the only son of the family. When he was a child his parents went abroad for work and he spent most of his childhood with his grandparents. In 2003, he enrolled at the 84th school and graduated in 2013. Later in 2013, he went to pursue a degree in IT engineering at the University of Science and Technology and finished his studies in 2017.

Internet career

Becoming the most-subscribed user and continued growth (2014–2019) 
While studying at university, Maambayar has started to make gameplay videos on YouTube. His fame was growing as he was getting recognized for his funny reactions he made whilst playing video games. At first, his videos weren't getting as much recognition, but still, he had a significant number of followers and viewers.

Gremix has started receiving public recognition from his gameplay and comedic videos and as he graduated university, he started to pay full attention to his YouTube career. At this time, Gremix continued making videos despite the few number of Mongolian content creators on the website. On 24 July 2018, he had become the first Mongolian content creator on YouTube to receive the Silver Play Button.

Public image and influence (2019–present) 
His gameplay videos made up his best-known content during this early stage, although he eventually expanded into other genres. This way he had become one of the favourite Mongolian content creators. Other than making videos on YouTube, he also started to challenge himself as an actor. In 2018, he made his debut as an actor on a comedy film ORK, then expanded his portfolio by starring in The Last Monita and I won't become a grandma (2019). In January 2020, he released his first single ‘Huiten baina’. Though it was meant to be a sarcastic ‘comedy’ song, it was well received by his audience. The song has charted on iTunes Mongolia Top 100 songs.

References

External links 
 
 

1996 births
21st-century male artists
Comedy YouTubers
Digital artists
Gaming YouTubers
Let's Players
Living people
People from Ulaanbaatar
21st-century Mongolian people
Video game commentators
YouTube vloggers